The Rise & Fall of Loverboy is the third studio album by American band, Sir Sly. The album was released on April 23, 2021 through Interscope Records.

Track listing

Critical reception 

The Rise & Fall of Loverboy received positive critical reception. Steve Horowitz, writing for PopMatters gave the album a 7 out of 10 rating, stating that the album is very self-aware; he noted that the album "is personal" but that the band "understands they are part of a larger society with its own problems." Horowitz summarizes the album as being eclectic, saying "The Rise & Fall of Loverboy is one of those odd albums whose musical styles and themes seem to vary wildly from track to track and even within individual songs themselves. Paradoxically, it is this feature that ties everything together." Horowitz described the album as a mix of alternative rock, indie pop, indie rock, and psychedelic pop. Jason Scott, writing for American Songwriter said of the album's sound that "such emotional threads knot and form the backbone of the record, frequently flooding the senses with frothy R&B elixirs and other genre-blurring mix-ups."

Writing for Glide Magazine, Jeremy Lukens positively described The Rise & Fall of Loverboy as "an upbeat amalgamation of rock, electronica, and hip-hop that straddles the line between pop entertainment and art. With no shortage of hooks, Sir Sly takes listeners on a journey of introspection, acceptance, and self-sabotage through infectious grooves and danceable beats." Lukens further stated that the album "is indie-pop with a thick finishing coat painted on a jagged surface, catchy and rhythmic but with an aura of danger."

References

External links 
 

2021 albums
Sir Sly albums
Interscope Records albums